The 2016 Perth SuperSprint was a motor racing event for V8 Supercars, held on the weekend of 6 to 8 May 2016. The event was held at Barbagallo Raceway at Wanneroo, Western Australia, and consisted of one race of 120 kilometres and one race of 200 km in length. It was the fourth event of fourteen in the 2016 International V8 Supercars Championship and hosted Races 8 and 9 of the season. The event was the 39th running of the Perth SuperSprint.

Cameron Waters took his first championship pole position in a rain-affected qualifying session for Race 8. The race was won by Craig Lowndes, who took advantage of younger tyres, courtesy of a two-pit stop strategy, to take the lead from his teammates Shane van Gisbergen and Jamie Whincup in the closing stages. After a difficult Race 8, where he went off the circuit and was later spun, Mark Winterbottom took victory in Race 9 ahead of Scott McLaughlin and Lowndes. After finishing eleventh in Race 9, Whincup lost the championship lead to Lowndes.

Report

Background 
On 27 April, it was announced that the series would be rebranded as the Virgin Australia Supercars Championship from 1 July 2016, with Virgin Australia becoming the primary sponsor of the category. On 4 May, Volvo, along with its performance arm Polestar, announced that it would withdraw its support of Garry Rogers Motorsport at the end of the 2016 season. The team stated plans to continue using its Volvo S60s in 2017, though this was cast into doubt when Cyan Racing, Polestar's motorsport partner, announced that the cars would be recalled to Sweden.

Jamie Whincup entered the event as the championship leader ahead of Scott McLaughlin, who had won both races at the previous event, and defending series champion Mark Winterbottom.

Practice 
Two one-hour practice sessions were held on Friday afternoon, both of which were open to Enduro Cup co-drivers. Tony D'Alberto, Dean Fiore, Karl Reindler, David Russell and Luke Youlden completed laps in the first session, while Reindler also drove in the second session. The first session started under wet conditions, with all drivers using wet tyres. The session was stopped after eight minutes when David Reynolds got stuck in the sand trap at Turn 6. The circuit gradually dried out and drivers began changing to slick tyres after 15 minutes. McLaughlin set the fastest time of 56.4211 ahead of Chaz Mostert and Tim Slade.

The second session was also held in mixed conditions, with drivers again starting on wet tyres before changing to slick tyres later in the session. A number of drivers elected not to run early in the session due to the conditions. Whincup's car had an electrical issue with ten minutes remaining; his team was able to repair the car and he returned to the circuit. James Courtney set a time of 55.9297 with five minutes left in the session before rain hit again, preventing any improvement from other drivers.

A third practice session was held on Saturday morning and was 15 minutes in duration. The session was wet throughout, with the fastest time being 1:03.3112, set by Winterbottom. James Moffat's car lost oil pressure, ending his session and forcing his team to attempt to change the engine prior to the qualifying session, which started 50 minutes after the end of the practice session.

Qualifying – Race 8 
Qualifying for Race 8 took place on Saturday afternoon and consisted of a single 15-minute session. While drivers started the session with slick tyres, rain began to fall soon after the session commenced. Michael Caruso got stuck in the sand trap at the first corner of his first flying lap, which caused a red flag and resulted in his exclusion from the rest of the session. The red flag was not displayed immediately, however, and several drivers were able to complete a timed lap, with the fastest being Cameron Waters ahead of Mostert and Craig Lowndes. The session was restarted after Caruso's car had been extracted, though only those drivers who had failed to set a time prior to the red flag being shown returned to the circuit. With the track now completely wet, the fastest of this group of drivers, Fabian Coulthard, qualified only twelfth, over four seconds slower than Waters' time of 59.6256. The session was stopped for a second time when Reynolds got stuck in the sand trap at Turn 1. With conditions not improving, Waters claimed his first pole position in the championship.

Race 8 
Race 8 took place on Saturday afternoon and started in wet conditions, with all drivers electing to start the race on wet tyres. Shane van Gisbergen, who had started fourth, took the lead from Waters on lap 2. With the track drying out, Scott Pye pitted after nine laps to change to slick tyres. The leaders began doing the same on lap 11, with Van Gisbergen emerging in front of Mostert, Waters, Lowndes and Whincup. Coulthard was given a drive-through penalty for an unsafe pit release by his team. On lap 21, Winterbottom went off the circuit at the final corner, dropping from tenth to 17th place. He made a second pit stop on lap 27, but was turned around by Dale Wood as he slowed for the pit lane entry.

On lap 28, Lowndes pitted from fourth place to fit fresh tyres; he would be the only one of the front-runners to switch to a two-stop strategy. Having dropped to 20th place, Lowndes quickly made his way up the order as other drivers struggled in cars with older tyres. He passed Van Gisbergen for the lead on lap 47 and went on to take victory by just under six seconds, surviving a late rain shower which crossed the circuit on the penultimate lap. Van Gisbergen finished second ahead of Whincup, while Will Davison, Garth Tander and Courtney utilised good tyre life to take fourth, fifth and sixth respectively. Todd Kelly finished seventh and was the first driver after Lowndes to use a two-stop strategy, while Chris Pither achieved his best result of the season by finishing eighth. Mostert and Waters had poor tyre life and dropped to twelfth and 13th by the end of the race, while Pye was given a 40-second time penalty for shortcutting the circuit, dropping him from eleventh to 24th.

Qualifying – Race 9 
Qualifying for Race 9 was a single 20-minute session held on Sunday morning. Mostert took pole position with a time of 55.0538, ahead of Lowndes, Winterbottom and Pither, who achieved his best qualifying position of the season.

Race 9 
Race 9 was held on Sunday afternoon and the race regulations required each car to take on at least 120 litres of fuel during the race. Teams and drivers employed differing pit stop strategies during the race, with some opting for a two-stop strategy and others for a three-stop strategy, due to high tyre degradation. Lowndes took the lead from Mostert at the start and led until his first of three pit stops on lap 14. Lowndes' teammate Whincup had been the first to make a pit stop, coming in on lap 10. Winterbottom and McLaughlin, both on two-stop strategies, led until their respective pit stops on laps 27 and 28.

Drivers on a three-stop strategy began making their second pit stops on lap 34, with Todd Kelly pitting from 15th place. Whincup pitted one lap later, while race leader Lowndes stopped on lap 38. Winterbottom obtained the lead when Tander pitted on lap 43 before making his second and final pit stop on lap 53, giving him a 30-lap final stint. McLaughlin ran longer in the middle stint, not making his second stop until lap 60. Rick Kelly also stopped on lap 60 and would emerge second of the drivers on a three-stop strategy after Lowndes and Van Gisbergen completed their third pit stops on lap 61. Once every driver had completed their pit stops, Winterbottom led McLaughlin by nearly 15 seconds, with Lowndes in third and Van Gisbergen in fourth after he passed Rick Kelly.

With younger tyres, McLaughlin, Lowndes and Van Gisbergen began closing the gap to Winterbottom. With his lead reduced to around two seconds, Winterbottom lost more time when Aaren Russell unlapped himself with five laps remaining. McLaughlin continued to close in and looked up the inside of Winterbottom at the final corner on lap 82, but compromised his exit from the corner and he was forced to defend from Lowndes going into Turn 1. This gave Winterbottom a small lead which he was able to maintain on the final lap, taking victory over McLaughlin by 0.3 seconds. Lowndes finished third to take the championship lead, with Van Gisbergen and Rick Kelly completed the top five, all within two seconds of Winterbottom. Winterbottom was critical of Russell following the race, saying: "I thought Aaren Russell ruined my race there, it cost two seconds, I thought it was over."

Results

Race 8

Qualifying

Race

Race 9

Qualifying

Race

Championship standings after the event 
 After Race 9 of 29. Only the top five positions are included for both sets of standings.

Drivers' Championship standings

Teams' Championship standings

Notes

References 

Perth SuperSprint
Perth SuperSprint